Eric Paley is an American entrepreneur and venture capitalist. He is the co-founder and managing partner of Founder Collective, a seed-stage venture capital fund based in Cambridge, Massachusetts.

Early life and education
Paley grew up in Long Island. He attended Dartmouth College, graduating magna cum laude with a BA in political science in 1998. He received an MBA from Harvard Business School with distinction in 2003 as a Baker Scholar.

Career

Monitor Group, Abstract Edge
Following his graduation from Dartmouth, Paley returned to New York, where he began his career as a strategy consultant for The Monitor Group. In 1999, with his brother and a cousin, he founded Abstract Edge Web Solutions, a web development company.  Their clients included the Million Mom March, a rally in support of stricter gun control that took place on the National Mall on Mother's Day 2000. Abstract Edge developed the website, millionmommarch.com, which raised more than $100,000 for the organization.

Paley attended Harvard Business School after leaving Abstract Edge in 2001. His classmates included Micah Rosenbloom and David Frankel. As MBA students, Rosenbloom and Paley partnered with MIT professor Douglas Hart to co-found and run Brontes Technologies, a 3D digital dental impression and fabrication system.  Based on technology from MIT and the research of János Rohály and two MIT graduate students, Paley served as the CEO of Brontes. Rosenbloom was its COO and Frankel its first investor. All three graduated from Harvard Business School in 2003.

Paley served as CEO of Brontes until 2006, when it was acquired by 3M for $95 million. He holds six patents related to the invention and commercialization of the Brontes system.

Founder Collective
Following the sale of Brontes, Paley began investing in technology startups with  Rosenbloom and Frankel. In 2008, with several part-time partners, they founded Founder Collective, a seed-stage venture capital fund with the mission of “being the most aligned fund for founders at the seed stage." Paley has led investments in companies including Uber (NYSE:UBER); The Trade Desk (NASDAQ:TTD); Airtable, Embark Veterinary, WHOOP and Cruise, acquired by GM.

Advocacy and recognition
Paley has been active in lobbying Massachusetts politicians for the elimination of non-compete agreements, fighting against patent trolls, and funding for student technology internships.

He has appeared on the Forbes Midas List five times. He was #9 in 2020, making him the highest ranked seed investor on the list. He was named to the Business Insider list of Top US Seed Investors in 2021 and 2022 and the Boston Globe Tech Power Players 50 in 2022.  He was an Entrepreneur-In-Residence at the Harvard Business School from 2011 until 2015.

Personal life
Paley and his wife, Shirley Paley,  an attorney, live in Lexington, Massachusetts.  They met in 1998 as students at Dartmouth College.  They have two children.

References

Venture capitalists
Angel investors
Harvard Business School alumni
Dartmouth College alumni
American founders
Living people
Year of birth missing (living people)